Chatham Roberdeau Wheat (April 9, 1826 – June 27, 1862) was a captain in the United States Army Volunteers during the Mexican War, Louisiana State Representative, lawyer, mercenary in Cuba, Mexico, and Italy, adventurer, and major in the Confederate States Army during the American Civil War.

Early life and career
Born in Alexandria, Virginia, the son of a preacher, Wheat moved with his family to Louisiana as a young boy.

Growing in size to 6 foot, 4 inches tall and weighing 240 pounds, Wheat's physical stature was impressive. He was elected a lieutenant then later as a captain in the First Tennessee Mounted Regiment under General Winfield Scott in the Mexican–American War.

He left the military due to illness and returned to Louisiana, where he was elected a representative of New Orleans to the Louisiana State Legislature in 1848.  He was admitted to the bar in 1849.

Subsequently, his wanderlust inspired him to undertake a series of international mercenary and filibuster adventures. He was commissioned a colonel by Narciso López in his Cuban filibustering expedition.

In 1855 he joined the Juan Álvarez campaign against Santa Anna where he was commissioned a brigadier general in charge of artillery by the State of Guerrero.

He travelled to Italy to serve under Garibaldi but soon left when his state seceded from the Union.

Civil War and death
At the outbreak of the Civil War, Wheat returned to New Orleans. Financed by backers of his previous Nicaragua adventures, he scoured the wharves of New Orleans to organize what became known as "Wheat's Special Battalion", or the "Louisiana Tigers", a hard fighting, hard living unit that performed well on the battlefield but was renowned for its lack of discipline. The battalion, which numbered 500 men,  consisted of immigrants from Ireland and Germany, as well as natives of New Orleans. Most of the men were "street toughs". They were generally considered to be at the "bottom of the barrel" socially. They were very loyal to Wheat, who was a charismatic and remarkably humble leader of men.

Arriving in Virginia just in time to participate in the First Battle of Bull Run, Wheat and his Tigers performed well in combat. Wheat took a Union bullet through both lungs in the battle; informed by a surgeon that there was no instance on record of a man surviving such a wound, Wheat replied, "Well then, I will put my case on record."

When his unit was placed under the command of then Brig. Gen. Richard Taylor in November 1861, conflict arose between the Tigers and Taylor. The conflict was resolved when Taylor commanded the execution of two enlisted Tigers who had been found guilty of drunkenness and insubordination.

Wheat and his battalion served in Jackson's Valley Campaign and the Peninsula Campaign. He was mortally wounded at the Battle of Gaines's Mill in June 1862. He is buried at Hollywood Cemetery in Richmond, Virginia. Later in the war, the fabled "Hays' brigade," commanded by Harry Thompson Hays renamed themselves "The Louisiana Tigers" in honor of Wheat.

Notes

References

 Dufour, Charles L., Gentle Tiger: The Gallant Life of Roberdeau Wheat, Louisiana State University Press, 1999.
 Parrish, T. Michael, Richard Taylor, Soldier Prince of Dixie, University of North Carolina Press, 1992.

External links
 Chatham Roberdeau Wheat Ancestry
 Confederate Military Records National Archives.

Confederate States Army officers
People of Louisiana in the American Civil War
Confederate States of America military personnel killed in the American Civil War
Louisiana Tigers
American military personnel of the Mexican–American War
1826 births
1862 deaths
Burials at Hollywood Cemetery (Richmond, Virginia)
American filibusters (military)
American mercenaries
Private military contractors
American expatriates in Mexico
American expatriates in Cuba